Conway is a city in Horry County, South Carolina, United States. The population was 24,849 at the 2020 census, up from 17,103 in 2010 census. It is the county seat of Horry County and is part of the Myrtle Beach metropolitan area. It is the home of Coastal Carolina University.

Numerous buildings and structures located in Conway are on the National Register of Historic Places. Among these is the City Hall building, designed by Robert Mills, architect of the Washington Monument. Since the completion of the Main Street USA project in the 1980s, Conway's downtown has been revitalized with shops and bistros. Highlighting the renovation of the downtown area is the Riverwalk, an area of restaurants which follows a stretch of the Waccamaw River that winds through Conway.

History 
Conway is one of the oldest towns in South Carolina. Early English colonists named the village "Kings Town" but soon changed it to "Kingston". The town was founded in 1732 as part of Royal Governor Robert Johnson's Township Scheme. It was laid out on a bluff overlooking the Waccamaw River in what is now known as Horry County.

For three decades, from the 1730s to the 1750s, King George II was very popular in the area. The King's birthday was one of the most widely celebrated holidays during that time. However, his successor King George III quickly grew unpopular with the townspeople. By the 1770s, the region of South Carolina in which Kingston was located in was overwhelmingly English, though there were also small numbers of Huguenots and Scots-Irish people. English-Americans in Kingston were very sympathetic to rebels in Charleston over the issue of taxation without representation. When the Royal Governor Lord William Campbell fled Charleston, the people of Kingston celebrated.

Many area residents fought in the American Revolution, and small engagements were fought near Kingston at Bear Bluff and at Black Lake. Francis Marion, who was known as the "Swamp Fox", had an encampment near Kingston just across the Waccamaw River.  The areas of Kingston and Charles Town were communities with a higher population of Tories than many other Colonial American towns during the Revolutionary War era.

Horry County was created in 1801, and its courthouse was established in Kingston. The name "Kingston" was later changed to "Conwayborough", to honor local hero General Robert Conway. In 1883, the South Carolina General Assembly changed the name of the town to "Conway".

Geography

U.S. Route 701, U.S. Route 501, and U.S. Route 378 pass through Conway.

The downtown is sited on the west bank of the Waccamaw River where it is joined by a creek called Kingston Lake. The Waccamaw flows south to the Pee Dee River and ultimately Winyah Bay at Georgetown.

Climate
Conway has a humid subtropical climate, with mild winters and hot, humid summers. The local climate allows plants like kale to survive deep into the winter months, despite the lower amount of light. 60's and 70's weather are not rare during the months of December, January, and February. Spring starts in March, as usual for the climatic schedule of the area. Comparable major metro areas for this climate of Conway include Montgomery, Alabama and Jackson, Mississippi.

Demographics

2020 census

As of the 2020 United States census, there were 24,849 people, 7,921 households, and 4,881 families residing in the city.

2000 census
As of the census of 2000, there were 11,788 people, 4,259 households, and 2,942 families residing in the city. The population density was 927.8 people per square mile (358.1/km2). There were 4,783 housing units at an average density of 376.5 per square mile (145.3/km2). The racial makeup of the city was 55.82% White, 41.85% African American, 0.21% Native American, 0.74% Asian, 0.03% Pacific Islander, 0.64% from other races, and 0.72% from two or more races. Hispanic or Latino of any race were 1.87% of the population.

There were 4,259 households, out of which 32.8% had children under the age of 18 living with them, 42.3% were married couples living together, 23.3% had a female householder with no husband present, and 30.9% were non-families. 26.7% of all households were made up of individuals, and 9.9% had someone living alone who was 65 years of age or older. The average household size was 2.52 and the average family size was 3.02.

In the city, the population was spread out, with 25.1% under the age of 18, 15.8% from 18 to 24, 25.3% from 25 to 44, 20.2% from 45 to 64, and 13.6% who were 65 years of age or older. The median age was 33 years. For every 100 females, there were 83.2 males. For every 100 females age 18 and over, there were 75 males.

The median income for a household in the city was $32,155, and the median income for a family was $39,189. Males had a median income of $26,720 versus $21,310 for females. The per capita income for the city was $16,611. About 15.9% of families and 20.2% of the population were below the poverty line, including 32.9% of those under age 18 and 16.0% of those age 65 or over.

Economy
Employers located in the Conway area include:
 New South Companies, Inc. (a subsidiary of Canfor)
 Vulcan Materials Company
 AVX Corporation

Grainger Generating Station was a coal-fired power plant operated by Santee Cooper. It generated electricity from 1966 until its retirement in 2012.

Arts and culture

Conway is the home of Kimbel Library and the Rebecca Randall Bryan Art Gallery at Coastal Carolina University.  The gallery houses differing exhibits throughout the year.

Sports 
HTC Center is a 3,370-seat multi-purpose arena located on the campus of Coastal Carolina University in Conway. It is home to the university's men's and women's basketball teams, and the women's volleyball teams. It replaced Kimbel Arena for this purpose.

Government 

The city is run by an elected mayor–council government system, with council members being B. Alex Hyman, Shane Hubbard, William Goldfinch IV, Jean M. Timbes, Justin Jordan, and Larry A. White. The current mayor is Barbara Jo Blain-Bellamy.

Education
Most of the county is served by a single public school system, Horry County Schools. Private schools include Conway Christian School.

Conway is home to two major institutes of higher learning, Coastal Carolina University and Horry-Georgetown Technical College. It is also home to a branch of Webster University, an MBA graduate school, and North American Institute of Aviation (NAIA), a flight school.

Conway has a public library, a branch of the Horry County Memorial Library.

Media
 The Chanticleer News (the student newspaper of Coastal Carolina University)
 Rivertown Radio
 Horry Independent

Infrastructure

Transportation

Air

Bus
A large part of Horry County is served by the Coast Regional Transit Authority (RTA), formerly known as the Waccamaw Regional Transit Authority and as Lymo. The primary station and offices are located in downtown Conway, near the historic district.

Railroads
R. J. Corman Railroad's Carolina Line is a short-line railroad which serves parts of North and South Carolina. Conway is located on the railroad's Chadbourn, NC-Myrtle Beach, SC branch. The historical Conway railroad depot is located along this branch, although the depot is now an office building.

Notable people 
 Bryan Edwards, American football player
 William Gibson, author, credited as the father of the cyberpunk genre of science fiction
 Junior Hemingway, former Michigan Wolverine wide receiver
 Edgar L. McGowan, former commissioner of the South Carolina Department of Labor
 Kristy McPherson, golfer on the LPGA Tour
 Allen Patrick, Oklahoma Sooners running back and NFL player
 Hunter Renfrow, American football player
 Sheri Reynolds, author and associate professor of Southern literature at Old Dominion University
 Nick Shalosky, first openly gay elected official in South Carolina
 Margot Stilley, actress and writer 
 Duley Trucc, musical artist
 Vanna White, co-host of American game show Wheel of Fortune

See also
 List of municipalities in South Carolina
 Conway is home to the Waccamaw Indian People, the original inhabitants of the area, who lived along the Waccamaw River.

References

External links

 
 

 
County seats in South Carolina
Cities in South Carolina
Myrtle Beach metropolitan area
Cities in Horry County, South Carolina